is a professional Japanese baseball player. He plays infielder for the Orix Buffaloes.

References 

2001 births
Living people
Baseball people from Osaka Prefecture
Nippon Professional Baseball infielders
Orix Buffaloes players
People from Habikino